Gaetano Curcetti (born 29 June 1947) is a retired Italian amateur boxer. He competed in the 1972 Summer Olympics in the light flyweight division, but was eliminated in the first bout. His elder brother Paolo was also an Olympic boxer.

1972 Olympic results
Below is the record of Gaetano Curcetti, an Italian light flyweight boxer who competed at the 1972 Munich Olympics

 Round of 32: lost to Kadir Syed Abdul (Singapore) by third-round technical knockout

References

1947 births
Living people
Boxers at the 1972 Summer Olympics
Olympic boxers of Italy
Italian male boxers
Light-flyweight boxers
20th-century Italian people